Freedom of Religion South Africa v Minister of Justice and Constitutional Development and Others  is a decision of the Constitutional Court of South Africa which found that corporal punishment in the home is illegal. The court found that the common law defence of "moderate and reasonable chastisement" is unconstitutional, so that parents are no longer exempt from prosecution or conviction for assault for striking their children. The unanimous judgment was written by Chief Justice Mogoeng Mogoeng and handed down on 18 September 2019.

Reactions to the decision were mixed. Freedom of Religion SA, the Christian lobbying group which had been party to the case, described the decision as "dangerous" and "destructive". It was welcomed by children's rights groups including Save the Children South Africa and the Children's Institute at the University of Cape Town, as well as by the Department of Social Development.

See also
 Christian Education South Africa v Minister of Education

References

External links
 Text of the judgment

Constitutional Court of South Africa cases
South African criminal case law
2019 in South African law
2019 in case law
Corporal punishment case law
Child abuse in South Africa